Medukha is a village in Ivano-Frankivsk Raion of Ivano-Frankivsk Oblast in western Ukraine. Hnyla Lypa River flows near of the village. Medukha belongs to Dubivtsi rural hromada, one of the hromadas of Ukraine.

History 

First written mention comes from the 15th century. Then  belonged to the Polish–Lithuanian Commonwealth, from 1772 until 1918 to Austrian (Habsburg monarchy, Austrian Empire, Austria-Hungary) empires, in 1918-1919 to West Ukrainian People's Republic. From 1991 belonged to Ukraine. 

Reading room of Ukrainian society Prosvita operated in the village.

Until 18 July 2020, Medukha belonged to Halych Raion. The raion was abolished in July 2020 as part of the administrative reform of Ukraine, which reduced the number of raions of Ivano-Frankivsk Oblast to six. The area of Halych Raion was merged into Ivano-Frankivsk Raion.

Attractions 
 Church
 Roman Catholic church

People 
 Dmytro Vitovsky - a Ukrainian politician and military leader, chairman of Ukrainian Military Committee, the first commander of the Ukrainian Galician Army, State Secretary of WUPR

References

Sources
  Koscioly i klasztory rzymskokatolockie dawnego wojewodztwa ruskiego.— Кrаków, 2002

External links 
 Medukha, google maps 
  Медуха. Замки та храми України
  

 
Villages in Ivano-Frankivsk Raion